The WWC Caribbean Heavyweight Championship is a secondary title contested for in the Puerto Rican professional wrestling promotion, the World Wrestling Council (WWC).

The title has been in use since 1975. Prior to being defended in the WWC, it was defended in L&G Promotions, until 1977, when the title moved to the WWC after L&G closed. For a time, the title was defended in the W*ING promotion in Japan as the W*ING/WWC Caribbean Heavyweight Championship. Throughout the years, the championship has been used on and off in WWC, although it was a mainstay of the promotion and defended regularly until the mid-1990s. It was revived roughly from January 1994 to April 1995 before being abandoned. More than six years later in December 2001, the WWC began contesting bouts for the championship once more. However, the revival of the championship would be relatively short and it was rendered inactive in late November 2002 and hasn't been promoted by the World Wrestling Council since. On September 25, 2010, the title was reactivated and captured by Hideo Saito.

The Caribbean Heavyweight Championship was declared vacated and currently inactive on March 31, 2012

Title history

References

External links
Wrestlingdata.com

Heavyweight wrestling championships
World Wrestling Council championships
Regional professional wrestling championships